The Kesitah is an ancient Biblical form of monetary measurement that the value or weight of is no longer known. The word is translated from Hebrew meaning, "part, measure, piece of money."

Biblical account
The word appears in Genesis  and Joshua  where Jacob paid 100 kesitahs for land near Shechem. The earliest Greek translation translated kesitah as "lamb". After God restored his fortunes, Job received a kesitah from each of his friends (Job ). Subsequently, the kesitah was probably a piece of money of a particular weight, cast in the form of a lamb (or unminted of a certain weight, the price of a lamb).

Archeology
Monuments in Egypt show that such weights were used as a form of currency.

References

Coins in the Bible